Todd Edwards (born September 17, 1971) is an American screenwriter/producer, film director, and writer working in Los Angeles. He is also an actor and songwriter/singer who is currently in the band called Blick Van Glory.  He was born in Grand Rapids, Michigan.  His first film was Chillicothe which premiered at the Sundance Film Festival in 1999, in which he wrote, directed, and acted.

Edwards later served as a co-creator, co-director, writer, actor, and song writer of the 2005 computer-animated film Hoodwinked!, in conjunction with brother Cory Edwards and Tony Leech and released by The Weinstein Company.  He then contributed to the writing of Hoodwinked Too! Hood vs. Evil released by Maurice Kanbar, the 2011 sequel to Hoodwinked!.

In 2010 he directed, co-wrote, acted and composed the feature film Jeffie Was Here

In 2011 he co-founded Hardy Howl Films with producer/writer Katie Hooten and producer/writer Timothy Hooten.

His older brother, Cory Edwards, is also a screenwriter, producer, director and actor.

External links

Anderson University (Indiana) alumni
Living people
1971 births
20th-century American male actors
American film producers